Jan-Otmar Hesse (born 6 February 1968) is a German historian of economics.

Life 
Born in Göttingen, Hesse did his community service from 1987 to 1989. From 1989 to 1995 he studied history, economics, political science, film and television studies at the Ruhr-Universität Bochum. Hesse was awarded his doctorate in Bochum by Petzina in 1999 with a thesis on the history of the Reichspost and telegraph administration from 1876 to 1914. Hesse was a doctoral fellow of the Fritz Thyssen Foundation from 1997 to 2000. During the 2005/2006 year, he was Fellow at the German Historical Institute Washington DC. He received his habilitation in Frankfurt in 2007 with a history of science thesis on economics in the young Federal Republic. From October 2010 to March 2015, Hesse taught as professor of general history, in particular economic history, at the University of Bielefeld. In 2014 he accepted a proposal by the University of Bayreuth for a newly established W3 professorship in economic and social history. He has taught there since April 2015.

His research focuses on corporate history, media history and the history of economics. His habilitation, published in 2010, focuses on the development of economics as an academic subject. In 2013 Hesse published the introduction Wirtschaftsgeschichte. Entstehung und Wandel der modernen Wirtschaft. This was followed in 2014 by an introduction to the history of the Great Depression written jointly with Werner Plumpe and Roman Köster. Since 2011 he has been a member of the scientific advisory board of the "Gesellschaft für Unternehmensgeschichte".

Publications 
Monographs
 with Roman Köster and Werner Plumpe: Die Große Depression. Die Weltwirtschaftskrise 1929–1939. Campus Verlag, Frankfurt among others 2014, .
 Wirtschaftsgeschichte. Entstehung und Wandel der modernen Wirtschaft. (Historische Einführungen. Vol. 15). Campus Verlag, Frankfurt u. a. 2013, . 
 Wirtschaft als Wissenschaft. Die Volkswirtschaftslehre in der frühen Bundesrepublik. (Campus Forschung. Vol. 947). Campus Verlag, Frankfurt 2010,  (zugleich: Habilitationsschrift, Goethe-Universität Frankfurt, 2007).
 Im Netz der Kommunikation. Die Reichs-Post- und Telegraphenverwaltung 1876–1914. (Schriftenreihe zur Zeitschrift für Unternehmensgeschichte. vol. 8). C. H. Beck, Munich 2002,  (zugleich: Dissertation, Universität Bochum, 1999 under the title: Der institutionelle Wandel der Kommunikationssysteme in Deutschland).
 Kulturalismus, Neue Institutionenökonomik oder Theorienvielfalt : eine Zwischenbilanz der Unternehmensgeschichte.

References

External links 
 
 Beiträge von Jan-Otmar Hesse in the 
 Page about Hesse at the University of Bayreuth

1968 births
Living people
Writers from Göttingen
Economic historians
20th-century German historians
21st-century German historians
Academic staff of Bielefeld University
Academic staff of the University of Bayreuth